Leigh Jenkinson (born 9 July 1969) is an English former professional footballer who played as a midfielder from 1987 until 2003.

He played in the Premier League for Coventry City, and in the Scottish Premier League for St Johnstone, Hearts and Dundee United. He also appeared in the Football League for Hull City, Rotherham United, Birmingham City and Wigan Athletic. He finished his career in non-League football with Barrow and Goole.

Playing career
Jenkinson, who played on the left wing, began his career with Hull City in 1987 and remained at Boothferry Park for six years, making over 130 league appearances for the Yorkshire club. Whilst at Hull, Jenkinson was reputed to be the fastest winger in the Football League and ran in the final eight of the Rumbelows Sprint Challenge, an ITV-organised sprint competition that was organised to test just who was the fastest.

In 1993, the midfielder moved to Premier League side Coventry City, then under the guidance of Phil Neal. After just two years at Highfield Road, which included a short loan spell at Birmingham City, Jenkinson tried his hand at Scottish football with St Johnstone. He won the First Division championship with the Perth club in 1996-97 before leaving McDiarmid Park in 1998 to return to England with Wigan Athletic. His stay at Springfield Park was short, and he left again for Scotland later the same year to sign for Hearts. In 2000, Jenkinson was reunited with former St Johnstone manager Paul Sturrock when he joined Tayside rivals Dundee United.

He finished out his playing career in non-league football with Barrow and Goole.

Personal life
After retiring, Jenkinson lived in North Yorkshire and worked away from the game. He also made an appearance for the Hull City Masters team in 2009.

References

External links

10 years on for class of '97
Temple of Saints idols

1969 births
Living people
People from Thorne, South Yorkshire
Footballers from Doncaster
Association football wingers
English footballers
Hull City A.F.C. players
Rotherham United F.C. players
Coventry City F.C. players
Birmingham City F.C. players
St Johnstone F.C. players
Wigan Athletic F.C. players
Heart of Midlothian F.C. players
Dundee United F.C. players
Barrow A.F.C. players
Goole A.F.C. players
Premier League players
English Football League players
Scottish Premier League players
Scottish Football League players
English football managers
Wales B international footballers
Welsh footballers
English people of Welsh descent